The tawny-backed fantail (Rhipidura superflua), also known as the cinnamon-backed fantail, is a species of bird in the family Rhipiduridae. It is endemic to Buru island in Indonesia. Its natural habitats are subtropical or tropical moist lowland forests and subtropical or tropical moist montane forests. The species occupies an area of larger than 20,000 km2 and has a stable population of above 10,000, and thus is not considered as threatened.

References

tawny-backed fantail
Birds of Buru
tawny-backed fantail
Taxonomy articles created by Polbot